Najafabad Rural District may refer to:
Najafabad Rural District (Kerman Province)
Najafabad Rural District (Kurdistan Province)